Chofa (lit. sky tassel) is a Lao and Thai architectural decorative ornament that adorns the top at the end of wat and palace roofs in most Southeast Asian countries, such as Thailand, Cambodia, Laos, and Myanmar. It resembles a tall thin bird and looks hornlike. The chofa is generally believed to represent the mythical creature Garuda, half bird and half man, who is the vehicle of the Hindu god Vishnu.

History

The representation of cho fah is unclear and believed to represent garuda, however, the present research indicates that the original chofah upon which most subsequent chofah have been based is the gajashimha of Suryavarman II, the Khmer king who built Angkor Wat. 

Temple finials representing gajashimha was presumably appeared in Cambodia during or shortly after his reign (1113 AD to 1150 AD). These finials (chofah) symbolized the unification of the northern and southern Khmer kingdoms and the reign of King Suryavarman II. This symbolism spread extensively throughout the region including part of today Laos, Lanna, and Isan which were once the Khmer empire.

From 13th to 18th century, ceramic finials or chofah in the form of the gajashimha were largely produced in Sukothai, Sawankalok, and Ayutthaya.

Today most wats or pagodas and palaces throughout Cambodia, Laos, and Thailand are adorned with these sacred finials at their roof end with many types and appearance.

Components
 Horn
 Tip
 Breast

Types
 Swan tip (Pak Hong; ปากหงส์)
 Garuda tip (Pak Khrut; ปากครุฑ)
 Fish tip (Pak Pla; ปากปลา)
 Elephant head (Hua Chang; หัวช้าง)
 Naga head
 Bird head (Hua Nok; หัวนก)
 Lanna (ล้านนา)
 Others

References

External links
 Thai Architecture
 Buddhist Art: Architecture Pt.1

Ornaments (architecture)
Thai Buddhist art and architecture